Mary McFadden (born October 1, 1938) is an American art collector, editor, fashion designer, and writer.

Early life and education
McFadden was born in New York City, and spent her childhood on a cotton plantation outside Memphis, Tennessee. When her father died, the family moved to Westbury, New York, and she was sent to the Foxcroft School from which she graduated.  She went on to attend Columbia University, the Ecole Lubec, the New School for Social Research, the Sorbonne, and the Traphagen School of Fashion (1956, Costume Design).

Career 
She has lived on Park Avenue in Manhattan.

She was working as the director of public relations for Dior New York in the 1960s, when she married a merchant for De Beers diamonds (Philip Harari, who she later divorced; see Personal life section below) and relocated to South Africa. From 1968 to 1970 she was an editor for South African Vogue, a job arranged for her by Diana Vreeland.

In 1976 she began the clothing company Mary McFadden Inc.

From 1982 to 1983 she was the President of the Council of Fashion Designers of America.

In 2012 she and her companion Murray Gell-Mann published the book Mary McFadden: A Lifetime of Design, Collecting, and Adventure.

She has also licensed her name to many products such as eyewear, footwear, home furnishings, and sleepwear.

Awards

Coty Award, 1976
Award of Excellence from the president of the Friends of Moore Ronald G. Dowd, 1977
Coty Award, 1978
Coty Hall of Fame induction, 1979
Neiman Marcus Fashion Award, 1979
American Printed Fabrics Council Tommy Award, 1984
Council of Fashion Designers of America Lifetime Achievement Award, 1988
American Printed Fabrics Council Tommy Award, 1991
Council of Fashion Designers of America Industry Tribute Award, 1993
Moore College of Art & Design Visionary Woman Award, 2008
United Nations Women Together Award, 2013
Included in the International Best Dressed List Hall of Fame.
Named on the Eleanor Lambert Vanity Fair Best Dressed List.
Named the first "Living Landmark" from the New York Landmarks Conservancy.
Received the President's Fellow Award of the Rhode Island School of Design.

Personal life
McFadden has claimed to be married at least eleven times, but declared that some of these marriages were "only spiritual".

McFadden is known to have been married to, in chronological order:

Philip Harari (married 1964, divorced). They were married in Bartholomew's Protestant Episcopal Church in New York City, and McFadden's attendants included Warhol star Baby Jane Holzer. 
Frank McEwen (married 1969, divorced 1970)
Armin Schmidt (later divorced)
Kohle Yohannan (married 1989, divorced 1992)
Vasilos Calitsis (married 1996)

McFadden has a daughter, Justine Harari, from her marriage to Philip Harari.

References

External links 

FashionEncyclopedia.com profile

The Creative Eye
Mary, Mary, Quite Contrary: The Life and Loves of Mary McFadden

1938 births
American fashion businesspeople
American fashion designers
American women fashion designers
Columbia University School of General Studies alumni
Living people
People from the Upper East Side
The New School alumni
Traphagen School of Fashion alumni
University of Paris alumni
Writers from Manhattan
People from Shelby County, Tennessee
People from Westbury, New York
Foxcroft School alumni